Oy Liikenne Ab v Pekka Liskojärvi and Pentti Juntunen (2001) C-172/99 is an EU labour law case, concerning the effects of a business transfer on an employee's rights at work.

Facts
Seven local Helsinki bus routes were run by Hakunilan Liikenne. They lost the contract from the Greater Helsinki Joint Board for transport. 45 drivers were dismissed and 33 of them rehired by Liikenne Ab. The contract award procedure was conducted under the Public Service Contracts Directive 92/50/EC, for competitive tendering in public services.

Judgment
The ECJ held that ‘bus transport cannot be regarded as an activity based essentially on manpower, as it requires substantial plant and equipment’. Labour intensivity will matter, but also it is just one of the seven factors of production outlined by the decision in Süzen v Zehnacker Gebäudereingung GmbH that should be taken into account.

See also

Notes

References

2001 in the European Union
Finnish case law
2001 in case law
2001 in Finland
European Union labour case law